Khagrachhari Stadium is located by the Khagrachhari-Panchhari Rd, Khagrachhari, Bangladesh.

See also
Stadiums in Bangladesh
List of cricket grounds in Bangladesh

References

Football venues in Bangladesh